In mathematics, noncommutative projective geometry is a noncommutative analog of projective geometry in the setting of noncommutative algebraic geometry.

Examples 
The quantum plane, the most basic example, is the quotient ring of the free ring:

More generally, the quantum polynomial ring is the quotient ring:

Proj construction 

By definition, the Proj of a graded ring R is the quotient category of the category of finitely generated graded modules over R by the subcategory of torsion modules. If R is a commutative Noetherian graded ring generated by degree-one elements, then the Proj of R in this sense is equivalent to the category of coherent sheaves on the usual Proj of R. Hence, the construction can be thought of as a generalization of the Proj construction for a commutative graded ring.

See also 
Elliptic algebra
Calabi–Yau algebra
Sklyanin algebra

References 

 

Fields of geometry